Bobcat Stadium is a football stadium on the campus of Texas State University in San Marcos, Texas. It opened in 1981 and was expanded in 2011–2012 to its present 30,000-seat capacity. Bobcat Stadium has been the home field for the Texas State Bobcats since 1981.  In November 2003, the field was renamed Jim Wacker Field in honor of the former Bobcats football coach and director of athletics.

History
The End Zone Complex was completed and dedicated in 2002. The facility located in the south end zone of Bobcat Stadium houses the athletic program's football operations. The End Zone Complex also has a full service training center, meeting rooms and coaching staff offices.

The capacity grew to over 16,000 at the beginning of the 2009 football season with the completion of the first phase of a multi-phased expansion. This first phase added The Jerry and Linda Fields West Side Complex, a three-tier structure (by adding onto the existing home side) that includes new premium club seating, with 450 seats, and 15 luxury suites. The facility's funding came from a donation by Texas State alumns Jerry and Linda Fields.

In 2012, a $33 million expansion closing in the north end zone brought the stadium's capacity to 30,000. That season, the average attendance was 18,945 in the program's first season as a Division I FBS member.

Other uses
During its 25-year history, Bobcat Stadium has been a multi-use facility. It has been the home of the Texas Special Olympics, and site of scenes from the movie The Ringer and the hit NBC TV show, Friday Night Lights.

Largest single game crowds

See also
 List of NCAA Division I FBS football stadiums

References

College football venues
Texas State Bobcats football
Multi-purpose stadiums in the United States
American football venues in Texas
Buildings and structures in San Marcos, Texas